Svoboda is a rural locality (a village) in Termenevsky Selsoviet, Salavatsky District, Bashkortostan, Russia. The population was 102 as of 2010. There is 1 street.

Geography 
Svoboda is located 57 km southeast of Maloyaz (the district's administrative centre) by road. Termenevo is the nearest rural locality.

References 

Rural localities in Salavatsky District